The Clemenceau Affair is a 1917 silent Italian adventure film directed by Alfredo De Antoni. The film features the first onscreen performance from Vittorio De Sica.

Cast
 Francesca Bertini as Iza
 Gina Cinquini
 Antonio Cruichi
 Alfredo De Antoni as Costantino
 Vittorio De Sica as Pierre Clémenceau bambino
 Arnold Kent as Sergio (as Lido Manetti)
 Nella Montagna as Matilde
 Gustavo Serena as Pierre Clémenceau

References

External links

1917 films
Italian silent feature films
1917 adventure films
Italian black-and-white films
Italian adventure films
Silent adventure films